Artworks is an album by saxophonist Art Pepper recorded in 1979 at the sessions that produced So in Love but not released on the Galaxy label until 1984.

Reception

The AllMusic review by Scott Yanow said "The performances on this Galaxy LP are essentially outtakes and leftovers from Art Pepper's 1979 sessions for Artists House, but the quality is quite high. "Body and Soul" and "You Go to My Head" are particularly special, for they are unaccompanied alto solos, and on "Anthropology," Pepper has a rare outing on clarinet".

Track listing 
 "Body and Soul" (Johnny Green, Edward Heyman, Robert Sour, Frank Eyton) - 4:35
 "Anthropology" (Charlie Parker, Dizzy Gillespie) - 6:32
 "" (Antônio Carlos Jobim, Newton Mendonça) - 7:59
 "Donna Lee" (Parker) - 5:55
 "You Go to My Head" (John Frederick Coots, Haven Gillespie) - 5:58
 "Blues for Blanche" [Alternate Take] (Art Pepper) - 7:26

Personnel 
Art Pepper - alto saxophone (tracks 1 & 3-6), clarinet (track 2)
George Cables - piano (tracks 3, 4 & 6)
Charlie Haden - bass (tracks 2-4 & 6)
Billy Higgins - drums (tracks 2-4 & 6)

References 

Art Pepper albums
1984 albums
Galaxy Records albums